Gymnopilus tyallus is a species of mushroom in the family Hymenogastraceae. It can be found in Tasmania.

See also

List of Gymnopilus species

References

External links
Gymnopilus tyallus at Index Fungorum

tyallus
Taxa named by Cheryl A. Grgurinovic